The Battle of Yijing was a military conflict which took place in northern China from 198 to 199 in the late Eastern Han dynasty. It was fought between Gongsun Zan, a warlord known as the "White Horse General", and Yuan Shao, a scion of the esteemed Yuan clan and former leader of the coalition against Dong Zhuo.

Background
The two warlords had been fighting for dominion over northern China for some time, but eventually Yuan Shao gained the upper hand. However, Gongsun Zan still had a large army which could cause trouble if not finished off.

Gongsun Zan, after recent military defeats in addition to a famine in his lands, decided to secure his supplies. He built a fortress, Yijing (易京; northwest of present-day Xiong County, Hebei), where he built many large towers on top of mounds where he and his generals lived. There were ten moats around the fortress and the towers had iron doors with huge grain supplies for Gongsun Zan to use to live out the civil wars in northern China. In doing so, Gongsun Zan let his armies away from his fortress fight for themselves thinking they would see the only option they had was to fight hard. Instead, the soldiers killed their commanders and surrendered or died easily while fighting.

Battle
In time Yuan Shao's army reached the gates of Yijing, but the fortress withstood several attacks from Yuan Shao's army for years until 198. Gongsun Zan sent his son Gongsun Xu to request help from the Heishan bandits in the Taihang Mountains. Gongsun Zan's idea was to break through the siege with his cavalry and group with the Heishan bandits, then attack Ji Province and cut off Yuan Shao's line of retreat, forcing him to abandon the siege. However, Guan Jing advised against the plan, saying that the defenders were only willing to fight to protect their families in Yijing and could not be relied on to defend Yijing if Gongsun Zan left. Gongsun Zan then took Guan Jing's suggestion to withstand the siege until the time when Yuan Shao would be forced to retreat.

After Gongsun Xu left, Gongsun Zan had sent a message to his son, instructing him to lay an ambush of 5,000 elite cavalry on low ground north of Yijing. They would then signal to Gongsun Zan to charge out of Yijing with his troops and surround Yuan Shao's troops. However, Yuan Shao's troops caught the messenger and laid their own troops in ambush. Yuan Shao's forces then signalled Gongsun Zan and lured him into the ambush, where they routed his troops and forced him to return to Yijing. Yuan Shao's troops followed up their success by digging tunnels under Yijing and then supporting them with beams, which they later torched. The tunnel went into the centre of Yijing and its collapse caused Gongsun Zan's towers to crumble as well. Realising his doom, Gongsun Zan killed his sisters and wives and committed suicide by self-immolation. Yuan Shao's men climbed into the citadel and cut off Gongsun Zan's head, which was sent to Xuchang to report Yuan Shao's victory to the imperial court.

Feeling that his advice had doomed his lord, Guan Jing charged his horse into Yuan Shao's army to his death, with the intention to follow his lord. By the time Gongsun Xu and Zhang Yan returned to Yijing with 100,000 troops, it was too late as Gongsun Zan had already lost the battle and committed suicide.

References

 Chen, Shou. Records of the Three Kingdoms (Sanguozhi).
 
 Fan, Ye. Book of the Later Han (Houhanshu).
 Sima, Guang. Zizhi Tongjian.

198
199
Yijing
Military history of Hebei